Kasetsart University Laboratory School, Center for Educational Research and Development, informally known as Satit Kaset, is a well-known laboratory school in Bangkok, Thailand, operated under the auspices of Kasetsart University's Faculty of Education. The school is located in Bang Khen campus of the university.

Overview
Kasetsart University Laboratory School was established on 22 April 1971 as the field base for the students of the Faculty of Education, under John Dewey's principle "The conception underlying the school is that of a laboratory ... It has two main purposes: (1) to exhibit, test, vertify and criticize theoretical statements and principles, (2) to add to the sum of facts and principles in its special line.". The founder and first principal was Prof. Dr Ubol Reangsuwan.
The school provides elementary, junior, and high school education. It also has the International Program and the Multi-Lingual Program. The enrollment of students is officially done only in Grade 1, but it is known that there are some minor enrollments in Grade 7 and 10. The students with special needs including autism and hyperactivity, are accepted into the special program.

International Program 
The International Program of Kasetsart University Laboratory School was first provided in 1994. It was the result of the government's plan to develop the English skill of Thai people. The International Program, sometimes referred as Satit Kaset IP, was the first public international school in Thailand. The program is run in a separate building located in the same campus as the regular program. With the exception of classes such as Thai language, Buddhism (Grades 7-12), Thai Music, D. Skills (Grades 7-12), Chinese (Grades 7-12), HPE or Health and Social Culture (Grades 1-6), all classes are taught in English by native speakers using an American-based curriculum.

Multi-Lingual Program 
The Multi-Lingual Program (Thai: โครงการพหุภาษา) was initiated in 2000.  Unlike the IP, subjects in this program are taught in Thai, same as the normal program, but the students of this program have to choose the "third language";Chinese or Japanese, in Grade 4. The program has its own campus in Amatanakorn Industrial Park, Chonburi, 28 kilometers from Si Racha campus of Kasetsart University.

Controversy 
The school's grade 1 admission qualification, which is conducted every summer, is problematic. The school indicates in the admission bulletins that 2/5 of the 260 enrollments is from the school's test, along with 2/5 and 1/5 from the university officers quota and "benevolent" parents quota respectively. However, it is widely believed that there are "pulled" students and the real portion of "examination passers" is less than indicated. (Still true in 2016-2017 school year.)

Alumni 

Noted alumni include:
Bhumi Jensen, a grandson of King Bhumibol Adulyadej
Khemanit Jamikorn, nicknamed "Pancake", Model of the World 2004 winner, actress
Suppasit Jongcheveevat, nicknamed "Mew",  actor and singer

Miscellaneous 
The school adopted the logo of the university, Phra Pirun Song Nak (Thai:พระพิรุณทรงนาค, Varuna on the Naga), as the school emblem. The difference is that the school version does not have the surrounding circle.
The school colors are purple and green. Purple is the color of the university's Faculty of Education, and green is the color of the university.
The school's "purple-skirt" uniform is quite unique and well-known, since most schools in Thailand use blue or black uniform. It also created the nickname Satit Krapong Muang (Thai:สาธิตกระโปรงม่วง, Purple-skirt Satit).
The school is one of the few schools in Thailand to use the term 'laboratory school' in their English name, after John Dewey's laboratory school. The other Satit schools prefer the term 'demonstration school', the direct translation of satit (Thai: สาธิต).
There is also a school in the university's Kamphaeng Saen campus named Kasetsart University Laboratory School Kamphaeng Saen Campus Center for Educational Research and Development. It is up to the Faculty of Education at Kamphaeng Saen and considered different school, despite its connections with the Bang Khen one, similar name, uniforms, emblem, and anthem.

See also 
List of schools in Thailand

References

External links 
Kasetsart University Laboratory School information in English
Satit Kaset IP
Satit Kaset Alumni Association

Schools in Bangkok
Kasetsart University
Educational institutions established in 1971
Demonstration schools in Thailand
Chatuchak district
1971 establishments in Thailand